Malaika Arora (born 23 October 1973) is an Indian actress, dancer, model, VJ and a television personality who appears in Hindi-language films. She made her debut as a film producer in 2008, with her former husband Arbaaz Khan, founding the company Arbaaz Khan Productions, which created the Dabangg film series. As an actress, she has starred as a lead in films like Kaante (2002) and EMI (2008). She also performed in the songs Chaiyya Chaiyya (1998), Gur Naalo Ishq Mitha (1998), Maahi Ve (2002), Kaal Dhamaal (2005) and Munni Badnaam Hui (2010).

Early life and background 
Malaika Arora was named after the Swahili word malaika (derived from the Arabic plural form  malāʾika) meaning "angel". She was born in Thane, Maharashtra. Her parents divorced when she was 11 years old and she moved to Chembur with her mother, and sister Amrita. Her mother, Joyce Polycarp, is a Malayali and her father, Anil Arora, was a Punjabi native to Indian border town of Fazilka, who worked in the Indian Merchant Navy.

She completed her secondary education from Swami Vivekanand School in Chembur. Her aunt, Grace Polycarp, was the principal of the school. She is also an alumnus of the Holy Cross High School Thane where she studied until ninth grade. She pursued her college education from Jai Hind College, Churchgate but did not complete it on account of professional engagements. She lived in Borla Society, Chembur opposite Basant Talkies before starting her modelling career.

Career 

Arora was selected as one of the VJs when MTV India started its operations. She began working as an interviewer, hosted shows such as Club MTV, and later co-hosted with Cyrus Broacha the shows Love Line and Style Check. Malaika then entered the modelling world, appearing in many advertisements, for album songs like Bally Sagoo's "Gur Naalo Ishq Mitha" opposite Jas Arora and item numbers such as "Chaiyya Chaiyya" in the 1998 Bollywood film Dil Se...

In 2010, she featured in the item song "Munni Badnaam Hui" in the film Dabangg, which was produced by her former husband Arbaaz Khan. On 12 March 2011, she helped set a world record with 1235 participants performing a choreographed dance to "Munni Badnaam" which she led.

She was the Taiwan Excellence celebrity endorser in 2012. She endorsed Dabur's 30-plus. She states that she never wanted to do acting. She performed live alongside Atif Aslam, Shaan and Bipasha Basu in a series of concerts at LG Arena in Birmingham and The O2 Arena in London.

In 2014, she confirmed that she would make a cameo appearance in the Farah Khan-directed action comedy-drama film Happy New Year.

Television 
Malaika appeared on the television show Nach Baliye as one of the three judges. The show was aired on STAR One in mid-2005. She continued as a judge in Nach Baliye 2 which started airing in the last quarter of 2006. In this show, she performed many item numbers as an example for the contestants. She appeared on the show Zara Nachke Dikha as a judge on STAR One. She was a judge on the show Jhalak Dikhhla Jaa in 2010.

Malaika is on the judges panel in the show India's Got Talent. She was the judge and host of the MTV Supermodel of the Year in 2019 and a judge of India's Best Dancer in 2020.

Personal life 

Malaika was married to Bollywood actor-director-producer Arbaaz Khan in 1998 whom she met during a coffee ad shoot. Since her marriage with Arbaaz until they got divorced, she was known as Malaika Arora Khan. On 28 March 2016, they announced separation citing compatibility issues. The couple officially got divorced on 11 May 2017. Together they have a son, Arhaan Khan, born on 9 November 2002. The custody of the son after the divorce is with Malaika, while Arbaaz has visitation rights on his son, as per the settlement reached in the Bandra Family Court. Bollywood actor Salman Khan and actor-director-producer Sohail Khan are her former brothers-in-law. Her former father-in-law was scriptwriter Salim Khan.

Malaika has been in a relationship with actor Arjun Kapoor since 2016. In April 2022, Arora had an accident on the Mumbai–Pune Expressway when three cars collided with each other as she was returning home from an event. She was taken to the Apollo Hospital in Navi Mumbai where she got few stitches.

Malaika became a vegan in 2020.

Filmography

As actress and dancer 
1998: Dil Se.. in Chaiyya Chaiyya
 1999: Pyar Ke Geet in Dholna
 2000: Bichhoo in Ekwari Tak Le
2001: Indian in Yeh Pyar
 2002: Maa Tujhhe Salaam (cameo appearance)
 2002: Kaante as Lisa
2005: Kaal in Kaal Dhamaal
 2007: Heyy Babyy in Heyy Babyy
 2007: Athidhi in Rathraina (Telugu)
 2007: Om Shanti Om in Deewangi Deewangi
 2007: Welcome in Hoth Rasiley
 2008: EMI as Nancy
 2009: Helloo India (cameo appearance)
 2010: Prem Kaa Game in I Wanna Fall in Love
 2010: Housefull as Pooja
 2010: Dabangg in Munni Badnaam Hui
 2012: Gabbar Singh in Kevvu Keka (Telugu film)
 2012: Housefull 2 in Anarkali Disco Chali
 2012: Dabangg 2 in Pandey Ji Seeti
2014: Happy New Year (cameo appearance)
 2015: Dolly Ki Doli in Fashion Khatam Mujh Par
 2018: Pataakha in Hello Hello 
 2022: An Action Hero in Aap Jaisa Koi

As producer 
 2010: Dabangg – Filmfare Award for Best Film, National Film Award for Best Popular Film Providing Wholesome Entertainment
 2012: Dabangg 2
 2015: Dolly Ki Doli

Television

References

External links

 
 
 

Living people
1973 births
Khan Arora Malaika
Khan Arora Malaika
Indian VJs (media personalities)
Malayali people
Punjabi people
Indian women television presenters
Actresses in Hindi cinema
Artists from Mumbai
Indian female dancers
Hindi film producers
Indian women film producers
Dancers from Maharashtra
20th-century Indian actresses
20th-century Indian dancers
21st-century Indian actresses
21st-century Indian dancers
People from Thane
Film producers from Mumbai
Women artists from Maharashtra
Businesswomen from Maharashtra
Producers who won the Best Popular Film Providing Wholesome Entertainment National Film Award